Steve Barrow (born 8 December 1975) is a professional rugby league footballer who played in the 1990s and 2000s.

Barrow started his career at Widnes before signing for Wigan in 1995, and played for the club during the inaugural Super League season. He suffered a serious knee injury in January 1997, and failed to make a first team appearance that year. He was loaned out to Hull F.C. in 1998, and signed a permanent deal with Hull FC on a free transfer at the end of the season.

References

External links
 (archived by web.archive.org) Statistics at rugby.widnes.tv
Statistics at wigan.rlfans.com
 (archived by web.archive.org) Statistics at hullfc.com

1975 births
Living people
English rugby league players
Hull F.C. players
London Broncos players
Place of birth missing (living people)
Rugby league props
Rugby league second-rows
Widnes Vikings players
Wigan Warriors players